Chaetosoma scaritides is a species of beetles in the family Chaetosomatidae. It is the type species of its genus.

References 

 

Chaetosomatidae
Beetles described in 1851